Gymnothorax pseudoherrei is a moray eel found in the western central Pacific Ocean around the Philippines. It was first named by Böhlke in 2000, and is commonly known as the false brown moray.

References

pseudoherrei
Fish described in 2000